Hamilton v Papakura District Council (New Zealand) [2002] UKPC 9 is a cited case in New Zealand regarding liability under tort for negligence under Rylands v Fletcher.

Background
The Hamiltons grew hydroponic cherry tomatoes, using the Papakura town water supply to supply their water needs. When they found their crop had been destroyed, they claimed that the water supply company and the local council were at fault, claiming that the water was contaminated by minute traces of herbicide in the water supply.

They claimed that this was a breach of the Sale of Goods Act [1908].

References

Judicial Committee of the Privy Council cases on appeal from New Zealand
New Zealand tort case law
2002 in case law
2002 in New Zealand law
Papakura District